Giovanni Battista Contini (1641–1723) was an Italian architect of the Baroque period.

He trained in Rome under Giovanni Lorenzo Bernini, but imbibed the influence of Francesco Borromini. He designed churches both in Lazio and the Marche. He designed two churches for the Oratorian order in Macerata and Cingoli.

References

1641 births
1723 deaths
17th-century Italian architects
18th-century Italian architects
Italian Baroque architects
Architects from Rome
People from Montalcino